John McGeehan is a British research scientist and scientific lead of the World Plastics Summit. He was professor of structural biology and director of the Centre for Enzyme Innovation (CEI) at the University of Portsmouth until 2022 and led a research team on enzyme engineering.

In 2018, McGeehan co-led an international team of scientists who characterized and engineered an enzyme with the ability to breakdown crystalline polyethylene terephthalate (PET), the primary material used in the manufacture of single-use plastic bottles, in some clothing, and in carpets. The bacteria that produces this enzyme, Ideonella sakaiensis, was originally discovered and isolated in a recycling plant by a Japanese research group in 2016.

The team at Portsmouth University, together with researchers at the U.S. Department of Energy's National Renewable Energy Laboratory and the University of South Florida, solved the high-resolution structure of the PETase enzyme using X-ray crystallography at the Diamond Light Source. The team used the structure to design an improved version of the enzyme, making it more efficient, and raising the possibility of further efficiency gains. They demonstrated that it can also break down polyethylenefuranoate (PEF), a potential plant-based PET replacement.

Plastics such as PET, while incredibly versatile, are resistant to natural breakdown and are now an increasing source of pollution in the environment. The research team aims to develop improved enzymes to breakdown plastics into their original building blocks so they can be reused as part of a circular plastics economy.

The initial research story was covered widely in the press in 2018 (The Times, The Guardian, and The Economist), television media (BBC, ITV, CNN, CBS, Al Jazeera, and HBO), and by funding organisations, including the BBSRC and UKRI.

The team has continued to make further improvements to enzymes that can break down plastics through the characterisation of natural bacterial systems followed by laboratory protein engineering. Their latest work employs the use of AlphaFold through a collaboration with DeepMind (video) to uncover the 3D structures of alternative PETase enzymes.

In 2022, McGeehan took up the role as scientific lead of the World Plastics Summit, an organisation supporting the development and delivery of solutions to tackle plastic pollution.

Education 
McGeehan went to school at Largs Academy in Ayrshire, Scotland, and earned a bachelor's degree in microbiology from the University of Glasgow in 1993, followed by a PhD in virology at the Medical Research Council (MRC) Virology unit, Glasgow.

Career 
Following his PhD in Glasgow, McGeehan worked in the Structural Biology Laboratories at the University of York before joining Professor Geoff Kneales' group at the University of Portsmouth in 2000, where he worked for five years on DNA-binding proteins. In 2005, he obtained a postdoctoral fellowship with the European Molecular Biology Laboratory, Grenoble, France, in Raimond Ravelli's group researching macromolecular crystallography and spectroscopy. In 2007, he returned to the University of Portsmouth, was awarded a Readership in 2012, and full professorship in 2016.

Research 
McGeehan has interests in enzymes involved in the breakdown and valorization of biomass such as cellulose and lignin, and the discovery and engineering of enzymes for the breakdown of synthetic polymers such as plastics.

References

Living people
Academics of the University of Portsmouth
Alumni of the University of Glasgow
Academics of the University of York
Members of the European Molecular Biology Organization
Year of birth missing (living people)